Geography of Asia reviews geographical concepts of classifying Asia, the central and eastern part of Eurasia, comprising approximately fifty countries.

Geographical characteristics

Boundary 

The land mass of Asia is not the sum of the land masses of each of its regions, which have been defined independently of the whole. For example, the borders of Central Asia and the Middle East depend on who is defining them and for what purpose. These varying definitions are not generally reflected in the map of Asia as a whole; for example, Egypt is typically included in the Middle East, but not in Asia, even though the Middle East is a division of Asia.

The demarcation between Asia and Africa is the isthmus of Suez and the Red Sea.
The border with Europe starts with the coast of the eastern Mediterranean, even though Turkey in the Near East extends partly into the Aegean Islands and includes Istanbul on the European side of the Bosphorus. On the north the boundary between the continents of Asia and Europe is commonly regarded as running through the Dardanelles, the Sea of Marmara, the Bosporus, the Black Sea, the Caucasus Mountains, the Caspian Sea, the Ural River to its source, and a long border generally following the eastern side of the Ural Mountains to the Kara Sea, Russia. The Arctic Ocean is the northern border. The Bering Straits divide Asia from North America.

On the southeast of Asia are the Malay Peninsula (the limit of mainland Asia) and Indonesia ("Isles of India", the former East Indies), a vast nation among thousands of islands on the Sunda Shelf, large and small, inhabited and uninhabited. Australia nearby is a different continent. The Pacific islands northeast of Australia more remotely removed from Japan and Korea are Oceania rather than Asia. From Indonesia the border runs along the Indian Ocean to the Red Sea. Most of the islands in the Indian Ocean are Asian.

Overall dimensions 
Multiple sources give different estimates of the area enclosed by the imaginary border of Asia. The New York Times Atlas of the World gives . The 2011 Pearson's has . The methods of obtaining these figures and exactly what areas they include have not been divulged.

The map surface of mainland Asia is entirely contained within a Geodetic quadrangle formed from segments of latitude going through its north and south extremes and segments of longitude passing through the east and west extremes.

Indonesia to the southeast, a nation consisting of thousands of islands, adds a significant amount of territory to mainland Asia and extends the extreme Asian latitude further south. The geographic nature of the country raises such questions as whether the sea and the seabed count as Asia. The Australia–Indonesia border is still being negotiated. Currently, a 1997 treaty remains unratified. As there are questions of fishing rights in the waters and mineral rights in the seabed, two different boundaries are being negotiated, one for the water column and one for the seabed. The southernmost seabed boundary is 10° 50' S, the latitude of Point A3, the Australia, Indonesia and Papua New Guinea common tripoint. The southernmost water column boundary is still further south at Point Z88, 13° 56' 31.8".

European views of Asia

The geographical or traditional view 

Medieval Europeans considered Asia as a continent, a distinct landmass. The European concept of the three continents in the Old World goes back to classical antiquity. Definition of continents has long been and remains primarily the realm of geographers, including cultural geographers as well as physical geographers.  A wide majority of geographers, in nearly all atlases and many other publications from the National Geographic to the CIA World Factbook and Merriam-Webster's Geographical Dictionary, define Europe, Asia, and Africa as continents.

The Hellenic origin 

The three-continent system was an idea devised in Archaic Greece, a time of Greek colonial expansion and trade throughout the Mediterranean and the spread of writing again. Writing is a prerequisite of written geography. It had been lost during the preceding Greek Dark Ages, a period of piracy at sea and defensive parochialism on land. The preceding Mycenaean Greece left scant record of some serving women from a locality in the later Asia Minor called Asia. Europe was mainly Greece, while Libya was a small region to the west of Egypt. There was no systematic definition of "continent;" however, the Greek mariners did make a distinction that was to become one: the islands, nēsoi, versus the mainland, ēpeiros. One etymology relates ēpeir- to the same Indo-European root from which English "over" came. The Armenian form means "bank, coast." The Greek form must be some sort of "overland," whether continuous land or a coast that looms over. In Latin it became continens terra, "the continuous land," shortened to just continens, stem continent-.

Most ships of the Archaic Period were not ocean-going. They followed the shores closely, ready to put in at the first sign of trouble. It is not surprising that the first continents were "shores," as they are in Herodotus, first historian whose works are extant, who relies on earlier geography now missing except for fragments. Asia is defined by two akrai, "bluffs" or "shores." One runs from Phasis in Colchis (Georgia) at the eastern end of the Black Sea around the coast of Asia Minor to Phoenicia. The second runs from Phoenicia to the Red Sea (the ancient Red Sea comprised also the Persian Gulf and the Indian Ocean) and from there to India, after which "no man can say what sort of region it is."

Asia is equal to its shores, which also define Europe and Libya. The northern shore runs eastward along the line if the Phasis and Araxes Rivers; that is, south of the Caucasus Mountains, and around the south of the Caspian Sea. The southern shore continues the Red Sea and the Nile River, as Darius the Great had constructed a canal between them. This division and system was already in place before Herodotus. He professes not to understand it: "I am astonished that men should ever have divided Libya, Asia and Europe as they have, for they are exceedingly unequal." His astonishment continues: "I cannot conceive why three names, and women's names especially, should ever have been given to a tract which is in reality one ... nor can I even say who gives the three tracts [akrai] their names." Previously he had spoken of two tracts. He says that an alternate northern border is the mouth of the Don River.

Strabo, geographer of the Early Roman Empire, has an explanation of the geography Herodotus found so puzzling. The key is the coast-hugging requirement of most ancient navigation. As the ancient navigator passed under the Rock of Gibraltar on his way into the Mediterranean Sea ("our sea" to those who lived there), two paths appeared to him, the north shore or the south shore. Strabo says:"Now as you sail into the strait at the Pillars, Libya lies on your right hand as far as the stream of the Nile, and on your left hand across the strait lies Europe as far as the Tanais."
To the ancient navigators of Our Sea, the continents were separated by seas. The canal extended the southern shore into the Red Sea. The symmetry of the scheme was too geometric for the Greeks to resist, as they represented all geographic masses by regular figures if they could. A triangle prevailed in the Greek imagination with points at the Pillars, the Tanais and the Red Sea. As the sides were three shores, the continents were three.

Imperial Roman geography 
The geographer, Claudius Ptolemaeus, distinguishes between geography, which is "a representation in picture of the whole known world," and chorography ("study of places"), which "treats more fully the particulars." The idea of the continents is geography and is presented as such. A chorographer in Ptolemy's view was the expert in a specific locality, such as a ship captain, a merchant, or a native. Geographers consult them but they do not write geography unless they happen to be both.

Ptolemy was a geographer of the middle Roman Empire, an Egyptian. The idea of the continents preceded the imperial Romans but through them reached to modern time to determine today's geographic views, which are enhancements and refinements of the classical. Stating that "continents are bounded more properly, when it is possible, by seas than by rivers," Ptolemy defines a three-continent system: Europe, Libya, Asia. His Libya is the North Africa of today, containing a province, Africa, whose name replaced Libya. Rejecting the Nile River as the Asian border so as not to split Egypt, Ptolemy designates the Red Sea as the border between Libya and Asia. In the north, the border between Asia and Europe is a meridian through the mouth of the Don River northward "to the unknown region." Asia Minor remains "Asia properly so called."

Ptolemy's Asia extends to the Far East, approximately identical to today's Asia, except that the European border runs through the future location of Moscow, then a wilderness of forest skirted by Sarmatian tribesmen. In a striking foreshadowing of European and Asian Russia, European Sarmatia lies between the Vistula River and the Don River, while Asiatic Sarmatia runs east of the Don to Scythia.

Geologic view 

The relatively recent study of plate tectonics has discovered that Asia has several regions that would be considered distinct landmasses if strictly geologic and tectonic criteria were used (for example, South Asia and East Asia). Definition of continental plates is the realm of geologists. Strictly in terms of geological landmasses or tectonic plates, Europe is a western peninsula of Eurasia and of the Africa-Eurasia landmass. In the latter, Europe and Asia are parts of the Eurasian plate, which excludes the Arabian and Indian tectonic plates.

Regional view 
In human geography, there are several schools of thought. The more common school follows historical convention and treats Europe and Asia as different continents, categorizing East Asia, South Asia, and the Middle East as specific regions for more detailed analysis. Other schools equate the word "continent" to geographical "region" when referring to Europe and Asia in terms of physical geography.

Ethnic view 
In European languages, the term "Asian" more commonly refers to ethnic heritage rather than a strict geographic area. In American English, "Asian" often refers to East Asians, while in British English, Asian often refers to South Asians. See the List of transcontinental countries for further geographic definitions. The term Asia Pacific generally refers to a combination of East Asia, Southeast Asia, and islands in the Pacific Ocean – and most are also considered part of Australasia or Oceania. Asia contains the Indian subcontinent, Iranian Plateau, Arabian peninsula, as well as a piece of the North American plate in Siberia.

Regions 

Since the 18th century, Asia has been divided into several subregions. There has been no universal consensus on the use of these terms.

The regions of Asia include:
 Central Asia
 Commonly understood as comprising Kazakhstan, Kyrgyzstan, Tajikistan, Turkmenistan, and Uzbekistan.
 East Asia
 Commonly understood as comprising China, Hong Kong, Japan, Macau, Mongolia, North Korea, South Korea, and Taiwan. A common synonym for East Asia is Northeast Asia, although some geographers only include Japan, Korea, and Northeast China in this subregion.
 South Asia
 Commonly understood as comprising Afghanistan, Bangladesh, Bhutan, British Indian Ocean Territory, India, Maldives, Nepal, Pakistan, and Sri Lanka. A common approximate synonym for South Asia is the Indian subcontinent which excludes Afghanistan.
 Southeast Asia
 Commonly understood as comprising Brunei, Cambodia, Christmas Island, Cocos (Keeling) Islands, East Timor, Indonesia, Laos, Malaysia, Myanmar, Philippines, Singapore, Thailand, and Vietnam. This subregion can be further subdivided into two smaller subregions: Mainland Southeast Asia (Indochinese Peninsula) and Maritime Southeast Asia (Malay Archipelago).
 Western Asia
 Commonly understood as comprising Armenia, Azerbaijan, Bahrain, Cyprus, Georgia, Iran, Iraq, Israel, Jordan, Kuwait, Lebanon, Oman, Palestine, Qatar, Saudi Arabia, the Sinai Peninsula (Egypt), Syria, Turkey, United Arab Emirates, and Yemen. Common synonyms for Western Asia are Southwest Asia and the Middle East. The Middle East generally includes Egypt, a transcontinental country between Africa and Asia.
 North Asia
 Commonly understood as comprising Asian Russia. A common synonym for North Asia is Siberia.

Asia's changing climate 

A survey carried out in 2010 by global risk analysis firm Maplecroft identified 16 countries that are extremely vulnerable to climate change. Each nation's vulnerability was calculated using 42 social, economic and environmental indicators, which identified the likely climate change impacts during the next 30 years. The Asian countries of Bangladesh, India, Vietnam, Thailand, Pakistan and Sri Lanka were among the 16 countries facing extreme risk from climate change. Some shifts are already occurring. For example, in tropical parts of India with a semi-arid climate, the temperature increased by 0.4 °C between 1901 and 2003.
A 2013 study by the International Crops Research Institute for the Semi-Arid Tropics (ICRISAT) aimed to find science-based, pro-poor approaches and techniques that would enable Asia's agricultural systems to cope with climate change, while benefiting poor and vulnerable farmers. The study's recommendations ranged from improving the use of climate information in local planning and strengthening weather-based agro-advisory services, to stimulating diversification of rural household incomes and providing incentives to farmers to adopt natural resource conservation measures to enhance forest cover, replenish groundwater and use renewable energy.

General data for countries defined as Asian by the UNSD 
The United Nations Statistics Division, charged with collecting statistical data on global regions including Asia, publishes a classification standard, United Nations M49, which assigns code numbers to continental regions, areas and countries, based on statistical purposes, and the countries and regions grouped together don't imply any assumption regarding political or other affiliations between the grouped countries. Some general data on the countries listed in M49 for the continental region, Asia (142), and one non-official region, "Northern Asia," are presented below.

M49 is a device for collecting useful statistics for the UNSD and is a suggested reference guide offered as a global standard for all agencies and institutions within the various UN departments that might be interested. The United Nations Statistics Division does not present it as an authoritative standard or as one that is more valid or more worthy of adoption than some other. It is not a requirement for other agencies within the United Nations, which use their own standards as are convenient for their operations.

No nations have adopted M49 as a mandatory standard. It does, however, reflect general usage concerning the political geography of Asia. M49 is updated frequently to reflect changing geopolitical circumstances.

One problematic aspect of the classification of Asia not yet definitively addressed by the Statistics Division is "Northern Asia," which has no regional code and is not currently officially a region of Asia. Russia, or "the Russian Federation," is a nation of Europe. The "Northern Asia" name is unofficially recognized; for example, the UN Group of Experts on Geographical Names includes an Eastern Europe, Northern and Central Asia Division. "Northern Asia"  comes from traditional usage, which divides Europe from Asia at the Ural Mountains. No one at the UN is suggesting that European Russia be included in Asia or that Asian Russia be included in Europe. Their policy is that a nation shall appear once in one region. They have selected Europe. The problem remains unsolved.

Geopolitical map of Asia 
The nations of this map with one major exception (and a few minor ones) are those defined by The World Factbook. Short forms of the names are used; sometimes abbreviations. All the nations can be found in the table below. The one major exception to the scheme is "Russia," not currently officially in the continental region of Asia, but unofficially partly in it even though classified as Europe.

Geopolitical data for Asia

Introduction 
The countries in this table are categorised mainly, but not entirely, according to the UNSD scheme for statistical purposes used by the United Nations Statistics Division. For example, the UNSD statistical geoscheme does not recognize a "North Asia," but problematic differences in point of view reach down to the country level elsewhere as well. Part of Egypt (Sinai Peninsula) is geographically in Western Asia, and the Australian external territories of Christmas Island and the Cocos (Keeling) Islands are often associated with Asia. However, these are not present in the UNSD geoscheme.

There is no universally defined standard Asia. Traditional views are approximate at best. Even today borders are still being defined, as between Indonesia, Australia and Oceania. As long as conflict over territory remains a human trait there may well be "an eastern question," as the British Empire said of the Ottoman Empire.

In evaluating the geographic position of nations of the edge of Asia some writers utilize the amorphous concept of "transcontinental countries,"  which has different meanings to different authorities. Merriam-Webster defines it as "going across a continent," as might a railroad. With regard to Asia, there is only one such country, the Russian Federation.

In a second definition, Petrovsky refers to a new tendency to form transcontinental agencies, meaning agencies whose jurisdictions cross continental borders, rather than the whole continent. Petrovsky's examples put together widely scattered sections of continents. There is no question of their trans- status. More precise views, however, require definitions of continents, which in the case of Asia are not quite so facile.

A third definition emphasizes transformation in place from one continent to another. Fahey at first defines Turkey as transcontinental by virtue of being in both Anatolia and the Balkans, neglecting the historical circumstance that the Balkans as part of the Ottoman Empire were once Asian, as was much of North Africa. He then hypothesizes that Turkey, accepted into the European Union, is defined by that circumstance to be European. By this usage, the very region to which "Asia" was first applied is now Europe. If it is, Turkey cannot be transcontinental by being split between two continents. This sort of paradox only underlines that Asia has no precise definition in the same way that nations do, to whom a mere 100 yards of border may be of great concern.

Data included in the table below are per sources in linked articles when available, the CIA World Factbook when not. No attempt is made to split populations. That of Russia is for the whole country; thus, the populations and areas cannot be summed to produce those of any defined Asia. The notes state which nations might be considered transcontinental by some agency, but there is little agreement generally.

Table

Table notes

Regional maps of Asia

See also 

 List of Asian countries by population
 United Nations geoscheme for Asia
 Indo-Pacific
 Asia-Pacific
 Pacific Rim

References

External links 

 
 
 

Geography of Asia
Geology of Asia